= Need Supply Co. =

- Formerly: Blues Recycled Clothing
- Industry: clothing
- Founded: 1996
- Defunct: 2020
- Fate: Downturn in sales
- Area served: United States; Japan
- Products: Men’s and Women’s Apparel, footwear, and accessories
- Owner: Christopher Bossola
- Website: https://needsupply.com/

Need Supply Co. was a U.S.-based e-commerce company founded by Christopher Bossola which was in business 1996–2020. The company shut down in September 2020 due to financial problems brought on by the COVID-19 pandemic.

== Overview ==
Need Supply Co. was a clothing and lifestyle brand based in Richmond, Virginia. The business was started with 300 pairs of vintage Levi's and a 250 sq. ft. store. The company later expanded their offerings to include men's and women's clothing (including luxury fashion and premium streetwear), accessories, footwear, beauty, and home products. In Richmond, it was known for its congenial staff and as a hub for the art and fashion communities.

In 2008, Need Supply Co. launched their web store at needsupply.com and have been growing a global customer base ever since. They curate a mix of well-known brands and up-and-coming independent designers from the U.S. and abroad.

Inc. 5000 named Need Supply Co. to its 2013 list of America's Fastest-Growing Companies, earning a ranking of 723 of 5,000.

In 2015, Need Supply Co. expanded into the Japanese market with stores in Tokyo. The same year, the company started NEED, a men's and women's apparel line designed and produced exclusively for Need Supply Co. In later years, NEED expanded into additional categories, including accessories and footwear.

In 2016, Need Supply Co. minority shareholders Herschel Capital Co., acquired the Seattle-based luxury retailer, Totokaelo, and entered into a long-term operating agreement with Need Supply Co. management to oversee operations for Totokaelo's Seattle and New York retail stores, as well as their e-commerce fulfillment.

Formal measures began in 2018 to merge both Need Supply Co. and Totokaelo under a single parent company, NSTO; the merger completed in 2019. At that time, NSTO also consolidated multiple Richmond, VA offices and relocated their staff into a new global headquarters for NSTO in Richmond's Scott's Addition neighborhood.

In 2019, Need Supply Co. (now officially NSTO) was again named to the Inc. 5000 list of America's Fastest-Growing Companies, earning a ranking of 1,711.

=== Closure ===
The company permanently shut down in September 2020. The company had insufficient capital to survive a downturn in sales stemming from the COVID-19 pandemic.

== Human Being Journal ==
In 2012, Need Supply Co. started designing and producing a biannual print magazine entitled "Human Being Journal," which featured independent artists and designers from around the globe, in addition to features on music, food, culture, architecture, and fashion. The magazine was distributed globally and in 2014, was also translated into Japanese. The Human Being Journal translation partnership eventually led to Need Supply Co. opening stores in Japan in 2015.
